John Stevens (born 22 February 1948) is an Australian former cricketer. He played two first-class matches for New South Wales in 1970/71.

See also
 List of New South Wales representative cricketers

References

External links
 

1948 births
Living people
Australian cricketers
New South Wales cricketers
People from the Hunter Region
Cricketers from New South Wales